is a national park located in the east of the island of Hokkaido, Japan. It was designated as a national park on 31 July 1987. The park is known for its wetlands ecosystems.

The Kushiro River, which originates in Lake Kussharo, meanders through much of the park. During the Ramsar Convention of 1980, in which Japan participated, the park was first registered as a peatland with raised bogs. In 1967, the wetlands (shitsugen) themselves had been designated as a national natural monument. For that reason, access is strictly limited and the landscape, most typical of Hokkaido, has been preserved.

Wildlife
The vegetation of the park consists of reeds, sedges, peat moss wetlands, black alder thickets. The rivers which bend freely back and forth, groups of lakes and marshes, and other wet ecosystems comprise a varied environment. Kushiro-shitsugen is home to over 600 species of plants. The park is a valuable haven for wild species such as the red-crowned crane (Grus japonensis), huchen (Hucho perryi), Siberian salamander (Salamandrella keyserlingii) and dragonfly (Leucorrhinia intermedia ijimai).

Geography

Related cities, towns, and villages
Kushiro Subprefecture
Kushiro, Hokkaidō
Kushiro, Hokkaidō (town)
Shibecha, Hokkaidō
Tsurui, Hokkaidō

See also
List of national parks of Japan

References

External links 
J-IBIS
Nature Restoration Project
Ramsar
 

National parks of Japan
Parks and gardens in Hokkaido
Protected areas established in 1987
Ramsar sites in Japan